is the remains of a castle structure in Annaka, Gunma Prefecture, Japan.

After Go-Hōjō's army defeated Takigawa Kazumasu's  army in the Battle of Shintsugawa, Matsuida Castle was seized and controlled by the Go-Hōjō clan.

Daidōji Masashige expanded and improved the defences of the castle against a possible invasion of the Toyotomi clan. In 1590, after the outbreak of the Siege of Odawara, the castle was besieged by a big army of the Toyotomi clan and attacked by Maeda Toshiie , Uesugi Kagekatsu and Sanada Masayuki.  Masashige surrendered after about a month of siege.

Its ruins have been protected as a Town designated historic site.

References

Castles in Gunma Prefecture
Historic Sites of Japan
Former castles in Japan
Go-Hōjō clan
Takeda clan
Ruined castles in Japan